This is a list of singles that have peaked in the top 10 of the French Singles Chart in 2011. 59 singles were in the Top 10 this year which 14 were on the number-one spot.

Top 10 singles

Entries by artists
The following table shows artists who achieved two or more top 10 entries in 2011. The figures include both main artists and featured artists and the peak position in brackets.

See also 
 2011 in music
 List of number-one hits of 2011 (France)
 List of top 100 singles of 2011 (France)

External links
 LesCharts.com

Top
France
Top 10 singles in 2011
France 2011